Echinochiton is an extinct genus of Ordovician chitons with hollow spines on its margins; these spines, which are unique among the chitons, have a strong organic component and show growth lines.

References

Prehistoric chiton genera
Ordovician molluscs
Monotypic mollusc genera
Fossils of the United States